The Shops at Ithaca Mall, formerly known as the Pyramid Mall Ithaca, is a shopping center located in Lansing, New York, just north of the city of Ithaca. The mall is situated in the junction between NYS Route 13 and North Triphammer Road. With a range of national chain stores and a food court, The Shops at Ithaca Mall caters to the Tompkins County and Cortland County region. The mall's current anchor stores are Target, Regal Cinemas, Best Buy, Dick's Sporting Goods, and Michaels. There are 3 vacant anchors that were last left by Sears, Bon-Ton, and DSW.

History
The mall was developed by The Pyramid Companies and opened in 1976.  There was widespread community opposition to its development. Originally called Pyramid Mall Ithaca, the mall was renamed The Shops at Ithaca Mall in 2007 under new management. The mall has undergone significant changes since its opening, with all four original anchor stores (JW Rhodes, JCPenney, Montgomery Ward, and Hills, later Ames) replaced. In 2002, JCPenney closed and became Best Buy, Borders Books & Music, and Dick's Sporting Goods. At the time of the relocation of the Regal Cinemas from its original site adjacent to Cafe Square in 2007, the mall was renamed from Pyramid Mall Ithaca. When Borders went out of business in 2011, the store became Ultimate Athletics. It has since become a Ulta Beauty and DSW (the latter has since been closed)

The original Hills/Ames space became Regal Cinemas in 2007.

There is also a Society for the Prevention of Cruelty to Animals annex for animal adoption. The annex has a "Kid's Corner" with picture books, stuffed animals, and adoptable cats and kittens. It also provides Pre-School Story Hour and Craft free to the public.

On September 25, 2014, it was announced that Sears would close.

On April 18, 2018, it was announced that Bon-Ton would close as part of a plan to close all locations nationwide, which left Target as the only traditional anchor left.

On January 19, 2023, it was announced that Regal Cinemas would close as part of a plan to close 39 theaters nationwide on February 15, 2023. but the theater has since stayed open past that date.

Events
The Shops at Ithaca Mall hosts a variety of events throughout the year. Past events included a spinoff of the American Idol Contest, bridal show, two weddings with Cayuga Radio Group, health and wellness fair, and a pet day. Members of the local community also hold fundraising events for non-profit organizations such as Habitat for Humanity.

References

External links
The Lansing Star profile
TheShopsatIthacaMall.com
profile

Buildings and structures in Tompkins County, New York
Namdar Realty Group
Shopping malls in New York (state)
Tourist attractions in Tompkins County, New York